Sally Murphy  (born 1968) is an Australian children’s author and poet, who has had thirty books published, including verse novels, picture books, and educational titles.

Biography
Sally Murphy was born in Perth, the youngest of six children, and grew up in the southwest town of Collie. She started writing stories at a young age, entering local writing competitions throughout her childhood. After leaving school she completed a Bachelor of Arts degree at the University of Western Australia and a Teaching Diploma at Edith Cowan University. She has worked as a teacher of high school English, and a range of primary school subjects including music, and also in other jobs including running a tourist information centre and working in local government.

Her first book, a book of printable educational activities, Speak Out, was published by Ready Ed Publications in 1997. Since then she has had thirty books published, including verse novels Pearl Verses the World (2009) and Toppling (2010), picture books, junior novels and educational titles.

Bibliography

Verse novels
Pearl Verses the world
Toppling, illustrated by Rhian Nest James (2010)

Picture books
Snowy’s Christmas, illustrated by David Murphy (2009)
Pemberthy Bear, illustrated by Jacqui Grantford (2006)
The Floatingest Frog, illustrated by Simon Bosch (2004)

Chapter books
The Big Blowie, illustrated by Craig Longmuir (2008)
R is for Rolf, illustrated by  Trevor Pye (2006)
Bugged, illustrated by Stephen Axelsen (2006)
Stuck, illustrated by Stephen Axelsen (2006)
Doggy Duo, illustrated by Teresa Culkin-Lawrence (2003)

Educational titles
Two Tricky Tales
Marty’s Birthday
Buzzy Fly
Be Careful
Remember Me
Over the Fence
Sonoran Desert Animals
The Extraordinary House
Icecream
Who Wants to Be a Millionaire
Desert critters
Frogs: Awesome Amphibians
Aussie Authors
Aussie Authors 2
Writing the News
Speak Out
Speak Up
Spellbound
The Book Book
Assembly: Poems to perform

Awards and nominations
Murphy was awarded the Medal of the Order of Australia (OAM) in the 2022 Queen's Birthday Honours.

Pearl Verses the World
Winner, Children’s Book category, The Indie Award, 2009
Shortlisted for the Indie Book of the Year Award, 2009
Shortlisted for Children’s Book, Mary Ryan’s Award, Queensland Premier’s Literary Awards, 2009
Shortlisted for Junior Category, Red Dot Book Award 2009-2010 (International School Libraries Network, Singapore)
Shortlisted for WAYRBA,  (Western Australian Young Readers Book Award), Younger Readers Category, 2010
Shortlisted for CBCA Children’s Book of the Year Awards, Young Readers Category, 2010

Worse Things 

 Shortlisted for the Children's Book of the Year Award: Younger Readers, 2021

References

2010 CBCA Publications Short List Information

External links
Sally Murphy's Website

1968 births
Living people
21st-century Australian novelists
Australian children's writers
Australian women novelists
21st-century Australian women writers
Recipients of the Medal of the Order of Australia
Writers from Western Australia